Dulovo is a rural locality (a village) in Staroselskoye Rural SettlementVologodsky District, Vologda Oblast, Russia. The population was 12 as of 2002.

Geography 
The distance to Vologda is 64 km, to Striznevo is 13 km. Gorka, Yakovlevo, Isakovo are the nearest rural localities.

References 

Rural localities in Vologodsky District